Jim Cleary may refer to:
Jim Cleary (Australian footballer) (1914–1993), Australian rules footballer
Jim Cleary (Northern Irish footballer) (born 1956), Northern Ireland international footballer
Jim Cleary (hurler) (1889–1937), Irish hurler